Phasiinae is a subfamily of flies in the family Tachinidae. The members of this subfamily attack only Heteroptera.

Tribes & genera
The subfamily Phasiinae contains the following tribes and genera:

 Tribe Catharosiini
 Catharosia Rondani, 1868
 Stackelbergomyia Rohdendorf, 1948
 Tribe Cylindromyiini
 Argyromima Brauer & von Bergenstamm, 1889
 Australotachina Curran, 1834
 Bellina Robineau-Desvoidy, 1863
 Besseria Robineau-Desvoidy, 1830
 Catapariprosopa Townsend, 1927
 Cylindromyia Meigen, 1803
 Hemyda Robineau-Desvoidy, 1830
 Huttonobesseria Curran, 1927
 Lophosia Meigen, 1824
 Mesniletta Herting, 1979
 Neobrachelia Townsend, 1931
 Neolophosia Townsend, 1939
 Phania Meigen, 1824
 Phasiocyptera Townsend, 1927
 Polistiopsis Townsend, 1915
 Polybiocyptera Guimarães, 1979
 Pygidimyia Crosskey, 1967
 Tribe Euscopoliopterygini
 Euscopoliopteryx Townsend, 1917
 Shannonomyiella Townsend, 1939
 Tribe Gymnosomatini
 Acaulona Wulp, 1884
 Atrichiopoda Townsend, 1931
 Bibiomima Brauer & von Bergenstamm, 1889
 Bogosia Rondani, 1873
 Bogosiella Villeneuve, 1923
 Brasilomyia Özdikmen, 2010
 Cesaperua Koçak & Kemal, 2010
 Cistogaster Latreille, 1829
 Clytiomya Rondani, 1861
 Compsoptesis Villeneuve, 1915
 Cylindrophasia Townsend, 1916
 Dallasimyia Blanchard, 1944
 Ectophasia Townsend, 1912
 Ectophasiopsis Townsend, 1915
 Eliozeta Rondani, 1856
 Euacaulona Townsend, 1908
 Euclytia Townsend, 1908
 Eutrichopoda Townsend, 1908
 Eutrichopodopsis Blanchard, 1966
 Gymnoclytia Brauer & von Bergenstamm, 1893
 Gymnosoma Meigen, 1803
 Homogenia Wulp, 1892
 Itaxanthomelana Townsend, 1927
 Melonorophasia Townsend, 1934
 Pennapoda Townsend, 1897
 Pentatomophaga Meijere, 1917
 Perigymnosoma Villeneuve, 1929
 Saralba Walker, 1865
 Subclytia Pandellé, 1894
 Syringosoma Townsend, 1917
 Tapajosia Townsend, 1934
 Trichopoda Berthold, 1827
 Urucurymyia Townsend, 1934
 Xanthomelanodes Townsend, 1892
 Xanthomelonopsis Townsend, 1917
 Tribe Hermyini
 Formicophania Townsend, 1916
 Hermya Robineau-Desvoidy, 1830
 Paraclara Bezzi, 1908
 Penthosia Wulp, 1892
 Penthosiosoma Townsend, 1926
 Tribe Imitomyiini
 Imitomyia Townsend, 1912
 Proriedelia Mesnil, 1953
 Riedelia Mesnil, 1942
 Sepseocara Richter, 1986
 Tribe Leucostomatini
 Apomorphomyia Crosskey, 1984
 Brullaea Robineau-Desvoidy, 1863
 Cahenia Verbeke, 1960
 Calyptromyia Villeneuve, 1915
 Cinochira Zetterstedt, 1845
 Clairvillia Robineau-Desvoidy, 1830
 Clairvilliops Mesnil, 1959
 Clelimyia Herting, 1981
 Dionaea Robineau-Desvoidy, 1830
 Dionomelia Kugler, 1978
 Eulabidogaster Belanovsky, 1951
 Labigastera Macquart, 1834
 Leucostoma Meigen, 1806
 Oblitoneura Mesnil, 1975
 Pradocania Tschorsnig, 1997
 Psalidoxena Villeneuve, 1941
 Pseudobrullaea Mesnil, 1957
 Takanoella Baranov, 1935
 Truphia Malloch, 1930
 Vanderwulpella Townsend, 1919
 Weberia Robineau-Desvoidy, 1830
 Tribe Opesiini
 Opesia Robineau-Desvoidy, 1863
 Tribe Parerigonini
 Parerigone Brauer, 1898
 Paropesia Mesnil, 1970
 Zambesomima Mesnil, 1967
 Tribe Phasiini
 Elomya Robineau-Desvoidy, 1830
 Phasia Latreille, 1804
 Tribe Strongygastrini
 Arcona Richter, 1988
 Melastrongygaster Shima, 2015
 Rondaniooestrus Villeneuve, 1924
 Strongygaster Macquart, 1834
 Tribe Tarassini
 Tarassus Aldrich, 1933
 Tribe Xystini
 Xysta Meigen, 1924
 Tribe Zitini
 Leverella Baranov, 1934
 Zita Curran, 1927

References 

 
Brachycera subfamilies